Falls Road station is a Baltimore Light Rail station in the southwest corner of Towson, Maryland, located near the Mount Washington neighborhood in the Jones Falls Valley. It has two side platforms serving two tracks.

History
The stop is built near the former location of the old Bare Hills Station on the defunct Northern Central Railway (founded 1829 as the Baltimore and Susquehanna Railroad as the second rail line in that new concept of transportation to go out from the city (after the B. & O. Railroad in 1827), which ran south from the state capital Harrisburg, Pennsylvania through York until the mid 1950s and a large portion of which now is a hiking / biking trail and continues south through the valley as the "Jones Falls Trail" to the center city. 
A northwestern spur line of the Western Maryland Railway ran nearby past Lake Roland in the late 19th century towards Westminster, county seat in Carroll County from Relay House in Baltimore County.

Images

References

External links
Station from Falls Road from Google Maps Street View

Baltimore Light Rail stations
Railway stations in Baltimore County, Maryland
Railway stations in the United States opened in 1992
1992 establishments in Maryland
Towson, Maryland